Nevada ( nə--də) is a city in and the county seat of Vernon County, on the western border of Missouri, United States.  The population was 8,386 at the 2010 census, and 8,254 in the 2018 estimate. The local government has a council-manager model. 

Nevada is the home of Cottey College, a private women's college affiliated with the PEO Sisterhood based in Des Moines, Iowa.

History

When French explorers entered the region in the late 17th century, they encountered the indigenous Osage people, who controlled a vast area including parts of what are now several states. The Osage Village State Historic Site, formerly known as the Carrington Osage Village Site, is located on a hilltop above the Osage River valley. Archeological evidence shows an Osage band had nearly 200 lodges and an estimated population of 2000 to 3000 here; they occupied the area from about 1700-1775. They were the most influential people in the region and were integral to the fur trade. After the United States acquired the territory in the Louisiana Purchase, it gradually forced the Osage through the 19th century to cede their lands and remove to Indian Territory. This site has been designated as a National Historic Landmark for its significance to the Osage people and American history.

Nevada was originally called "Hog Eye" by European-American settlers, and under that name was platted in 1855.  The town's name was changed to Nevada by circuit and county clerk DeWitt C. Hunter, after Nevada City, California, where he had been a gold miner.

From 1897−1933, Nevada was home to the Weltmer Institute of Suggestive Therapeutics, founded by Sidney Abram Weltmer and Joseph H. Kelly. Weltmer bought a 17-room mansion, built in 1886 by Frank P. Anderson, a successful railroad builder. They wanted a facility large enough so that they could have patients stay for extended periods in a kind of boarding house. During the early 20th century, this healing institute attracted thousands of clients who believed in Weltmer's cures by mental healing. People paid $100 to stay for a 10-day course of treatment. They also paid for instructional classes. The Institute also conducted a large mail-order business for classes and a kind of treatment by mail. It held lectures attracting several hundred people.

The Institute attracted so many clients that the railroad added new trains to its schedule serving the town. In addition, the volume of mail associated with the Institute's business resulted in the post office being classified as first class, and the government building a new, larger post office to handle it. The Weltmer Institute became the center of associated wellness systems and practitioners in town, which increased in prosperity. It attracted psychotherapists, clairvoyants, and people promising various types of miracle cures  for such illnesses as tuberculosis, which then had no cure.

In the early 20th century, the town attracted many enthusiasts of what was known as the New Thought Movement. In 1905 the Weltmer Auditorium was the site of the Fifth Annual Convention of the New Thought Federation, held on September 26–29, 1905. Ernest Weltmer, the eldest son of Sidney A. Weltmer, was Secretary of the Federation and helped open the convention. Among the several speakers from across the country was Grace Mann Brown, and entertainment was provided by singers including the Weltmer Quartette. Mrs. Brown served as President of the Federation the following year. In 1916, New Thought followers returned to Nevada for the second International Conference of the movement, and Sidney A. Weltmer was among the speakers. 

After Weltmer's death and the Institute's closure in 1933, the mansion was sold for use as a funeral home. By late 2004, the building was slated for demolition to redevelop the site. Although some residents were interested in its history and the Weltmer Institute, the building was never nominated as a significant historic building or classified for preservation. The City Council approved it being scheduled to be demolished in late 2004 for other development.

Significant historic properties in Nevada include the Infirmary Building, Missouri State Hospital Number 3, Vernon County Courthouse, and Vernon County Jail, Sheriff's House and Office, which are also listed on the National Register of Historic Places.

Geography
Nevada is located in central Vernon County at the intersection of US routes 71 and 54.

Climate

Demographics

2010 census
As of the census of 2010, there were 8,386 people, 3,491 households, and 1,908 families living in the city. The racial makeup of the city was 95.1% White, 1.1% African American, 0.8% Native American, 0.8% Asian, 0.6% from other races, and 1.6% from two or more races. Hispanic or Latino of any race were 2.0% of the population.

There were 3,491 households, of which 28.2% had children under the age of 18 living with them, 35.9% were married couples living together, 14.1% had a female householder with no husband present, 4.6% had a male householder with no wife present, and 45.3% were non-families. 40.3% of all households were made up of individuals, and 17.1% had someone living alone who was 65 years of age or older. The average household size was 2.16, and the average family size was 2.88.

The median age in the city was 38.3 years. 23.3% of residents were under 18; 11.5% were between the ages of 18 and 24; 22.6% were from 25 to 44; 24.4% were from 45 to 64; and 18.2% were 65 years of age or older. The gender makeup of the city was 45.3% male and 54.7% female.

2000 census
As of the census of 2000, there were 8,607 people, 3,463 households, and 1,973 families living in the city. The population density was 964.1 people per square mile (372.1/km). There were 3,857 housing units at an average density of 432.0 per square mile (166.8/km). The racial makeup of the city was 95.79% White, 1.03% African American, 0.94% Native American, 0.44% Asian, 0.05% Pacific Islander, 0.49% from other races, and 1.25% from two or more races. Hispanic or Latino of any race were 1.29% of the population.

There were 3,463 households, out of which 29.9% had children under the age of 18 living with them, 40.1% were married couples living together, 13.3% had a female householder with no husband present, and 43.0% were non-families. 38.5% of all households were made up of individuals, and 17.8% had someone living alone who was 65 years of age or older. The average household size was 2.22, and the average family size was 2.95.

In the city, the population was spread out, with 25.8% under the age of 18, 11.8% from 18 to 24, 24.7% from 25 to 44, 18.8% from 45 to 64, and 18.9% 65 years of age or older. The median age was 35 years. For every 100 females, there were 82.1 males. For every 100 females age 18 and over, there were 74.3 males.

The median income for a household in the city was $25,774, and the median income for a family was $36,639. Males had a median income of $28,939 versus $17,424 for females. The per capita income for the city was $15,118. About 13.7% of families and 20.0% of the population were below the poverty line, including 28.7% of those under age 18 and 16.4% of those age 65 or over.

Education
Public education in Nevada is administered by the Nevada R-V School District, which operates Nevada High School.

Nevada has a lending library, the Nevada Public Library.

Nevada is home to Cottey College which is a private women's college. It was founded by Virginia Alice (Cottey) Stockard in 1884. Since 1927 it has been owned and supported by the P.E.O. Sisterhood, a philanthropic women's organization based on Des Moines, Iowa. It was founded as a preparatory school for girls and women, and by 1932 was a two-year liberal arts college. In 2011 it achieved accreditation as a four-year baccalaureate-granting college.

Notable people

 Russell Alexander — circus band composer, performer, and entertainer
 Eva Bowring − United States Senator for Nebraska
 Patricia Breckenridge − current Associate Justice of Supreme Court of Missouri
 Forrest DeBernardi − member of the Basketball Hall of Fame
 Ed Emery — state senator and former state representative
 Clark Griffith - co-founder of the American League, member of the National Baseball Hall of Fame and Museum and Major League Baseball pitcher, manager, and team owner (lived there in his youth)
 John Huston − actor, director, screenwriter, and producer (born there)
 Frank James − guerrilla and outlaw, brother of Jesse James
 George Lyons (baseball) - Major League Baseball pitcher who played for the 1920 St. Louis Cardinals and the 1924 St. Louis Browns (moved to Nevada in 1929 and lived there until his death in 1981) the Lyons Stadium baseball park is named after him
 Brett Merriman — Major League Baseball player, Nevada High School 1984 graduating class.
 Bill Phelps − former lieutenant governor of Missouri
 Kimbrough Stone - United States Circuit judge
 Marion Talley - A famous American opera coloratura soprano, and was in a major motion picture Follow Your Heart (born there)
 Sue Thompson − country and pop singer, born Eva Sue McKee
 Sidney Weltmer - founder of the Weltmer Institute of Suggestive Therapeutics

References

External links

 City of Nevada
 Nevada Chamber of Commerce
 Nevada Daily Mail
 Nevada Public Library
 Nevada R-5 School District
 Historical maps of Nevada in the Sanborn Maps of Missouri Collection at the University of Missouri
 
 

Cities in Vernon County, Missouri
County seats in Missouri
Populated places established in 1855
Cities in Missouri
1855 establishments in Missouri